The Van may refer to:

 The Van (1977 film), a teenage comedy film by Sam Grossman
 The Van (novel), a novel (1991) by Roddy Doyle
 The Van (1996 film), a film by Stephen Frears, based on Doyle's novel
 "The Van", an episode of the British sitcom Oh, Doctor Beeching!